Tunstall is a village in Holderness, in the East Riding of Yorkshire, England, close to the North Sea coast.

Geography

Tunstall village is located in the civil parish of Roos in Holderness, in the East Riding of Yorkshire, England.

The coast at Tunstall is eroding at an average rate of  a year.

History
Tunstall was recorded in the Domesday Book of 1086 as "Tunestal", within the manor of Withernsea. The church of All Saints was originally of Norman construction, with many later alterations in the 13th and 14th centuries, primarily of beach cobble with stone dressings; a tower was added in the 15th century.

A number of buildings in the village date to the early 18th century, including the cobble-built Town Farmhouse, Manor Farmhouse and nearby barn. The brick-built Hall Farmhouse was constructed in the later 18th century, An enclosure act for the land around the village was passed in 1777. The Kings Arms public house dates back to at least the 1850s.

In 1823 inhabitants in the village numbered 163. Occupations included eight farmers, two shopkeepers, a tailor, a corn factor, and the landlady of the Cock public house. A carrier operated between the village and Hull on Tuesdays. Tunstall was close to the coastal Sand le Mar, an area frequented by neighbouring village inhabitants collecting sand and pebbles for the repair of roads.

During the anti-invasion preparations of the Second World War a number of fortifications were constructed near Tunstall, including: a minefield north of the village, a weapons pit, several coastal pillboxes, and tank traps.

After the end of the Second World War, one of the pillbox structures was re-used as a nuclear explosion monitoring post (Royal Observer Corps Monitoring Post) during the Cold War period.

The Greenwich meridian was marked by a re-sited trig point in 1999; the marker fell into the sea in 2003 as a result of coastal erosion.

In 2016, a 'Golf-Ball' style weather station was installed near the village to monitor weather conditions around the Westermost Rough Wind Farm. The inhabitants of Tunstall would like to see its removal as they believe its radar has been the cause of a number of rare cancers in the villagers. A report by East Riding County Council determined the radar extended a 60° beam outwards across the sea and the nearest homes were outside the field of this beam. Ørsted, the Westermost Rough wind farm operating company, have stated that the radar is within international guidelines and applied to extend the life of the station to 2019.

Governance
Tunstall forms part of the civil parish of Roos and is represented locally by Roos Parish Council while at county level is in the South East Holderness ward of the East Riding of Yorkshire Council. At a parliamentary level it is part of the Beverley and Holderness constituency which is currently represented (as of 2023) by Graham Stuart of the Conservative Party. Before Britain's exit from the EU Tunstall was in the Yorkshire and the Humber constituency.

References

Sources

External links

Villages in the East Riding of Yorkshire
Holderness
Populated coastal places in the East Riding of Yorkshire